Dennis Webster DeConcini (born May 8, 1937) is an American lawyer, philanthropist, politician and former Democratic U.S. Senator from Arizona. The son of former Arizona Supreme Court Judge Evo Anton DeConcini, he represented Arizona in the United States Senate from 1977 until 1995. After his re-election in 1988, no Arizona Democrats were elected to the United States Senate for 30 years until Kyrsten Sinema won his former seat in 2018.

Background information
DeConcini was born in Tucson, Arizona, the son of Ora (née Webster) and Evo Anton DeConcini.

His father was judge on the Arizona State Superior Court for 10 years, then served as the Arizona Attorney General for one two-year term from 1948 to 1949 before being appointed to the Arizona State Supreme Court, where he served as a judge for four years, from 1949 to 1953. DeConcini received his bachelor's degree from the University of Arizona in 1959, and his LLB from the University of Arizona in 1963. He then worked as a lawyer for the Arizona Governor's staff from 1965 to 1967. DeConcini attended The JAG School at the University of Virginia and entered U.S. Army JAG Corps.

Dennis DeConcini rejoined the law firm of DeConcini McDonald Yetwin and Lacy, which he and his father had co-founded in 1968, after leaving the Senate in 1995.

He is a member of the advisory council of the Victims of Communism Memorial Foundation.

Political career
DeConcini served one elected term as Pima County, Arizona Attorney (1973–1976), the chief prosecutor and civil attorney for the county and school districts within the county.

He was elected to the U.S. Senate in 1976 as a Democrat, defeated Republican Representative Sam Steiger for the open seat left by retiring Republican senator Paul Fannin. DeConcini served three terms in the Senate.

Panama Canal
DeConcini sponsored an amendment (the DeConcini Reservation) to the Panama Canal Treaty of 1977 which allows the United States "to take such steps as each [the U.S. or Panama] deems necessary, in accordance with its constitutional processes, including the use of military force in the Republic of Panama, to reopen the Canal or restore the operations of the Canal, as the case may be."

Keating Five
DeConcini was widely noted as a member of the Keating Five in a banking and political contribution ethics investigation during the 1980s which grew out of the U.S. Savings and Loan Crisis. The Senate investigation involved Charles Keating and Lincoln Savings/Continental Homes, the sixth largest employer in the state of Arizona at the time.  The Senate Ethics Committee looked into the actions of five United States Senators in relation to their actions connected with Charles Keating and concluded that Senators DeConcini, McCain, Glenn and Riegle "broke no laws or Senate ethics rules, but were aggressive in their actions on behalf of Charles Keating."  Specifically, DeConcini was judged to have "acted improperly" and did not run for a fourth term.

Senate committees

In the 101st Congress, DeConcini served on the Senate Appropriations Committee, chairing the Subcommittee on Treasury, Postal Service and General Government. He also served on the Subcommittees on Defense, Energy and Water Development and Foreign Operations, and on the Senate Judiciary Committee, chairing the Subcommittee on Patents, Copyrights and Trademarks. He served on the Subcommittees on Antitrust, Monopolies and Business Rights, the Constitution and the Courts.

In 1993 and 1994, DeConcini chaired the Select Intelligence Committee.

Appointments
In February 1995 DeConcini was appointed by President Bill Clinton to the board of directors of the Federal Home Loan Mortgage Corporation (Freddie Mac), where he served until May 1999.

In 2006, he and former Del E. Webb Construction Company President Anne Mariucci were selected by Governor of Arizona Janet Napolitano to sit on the Arizona Board of Regents.

Congressional papers
DeConcini's congressional papers are held at the University of Arizona Libraries, Special Collections.

Business career
DeConcini served on the board of directors of the Corrections Corporation of America (now known as CoreCivic) from 2008 to 2014. Starting in 2010, some individuals protested his membership on the board, saying his involvement is "not suitable for a public figure like DeConcini." Although he claims he has not lobbied for harsher immigration laws and sentencing practices, he admits meetings with the Arizona Department of Corrections Director Chuck Ryan and "publicly speaking in favor of" for-profit prisons.

It was alleged that, in 1979, DeConcini had insider knowledge about the proposed route of the Central Arizona Project and that he used this knowledge to purchase land that he resold six years later to the federal government for a gain of almost $1,000,000.

Philanthropy

DeConcini is a member of the board of directors of the International Centre for Missing & Exploited Children (ICMEC), a global nonprofit organization that combats child sexual exploitation, child pornography, and child abduction.

Book
 Senator Dennis DeConcini: From the Center of the Aisle by Dennis DeConcini & Jack L. August Jr., (University of Arizona Press February 1, 2006);

References

External links

 Speaking about President Carter and Senate on KJZZ Radio 
 
 Parry, Romani, DeConcini & Symms
 Deconcini Mcdonald Law Firm
 Deconcini on Panama Canal
 
 DeCONCINI & Warner
 DeConcini Backs Senator Obama

|-

|-

|-

|-

|-

1937 births
American male non-fiction writers
American political writers
American prosecutors
Arizona Democrats
Arizona lawyers
CoreCivic people
Democratic Party United States senators from Arizona
Lawyers from Tucson, Arizona
Living people
Politicians from Tucson, Arizona
United States Army officers
University of Arizona alumni
James E. Rogers College of Law alumni
Writers from Tucson, Arizona
The Judge Advocate General's Legal Center and School alumni
American people of Italian descent
20th-century American politicians
21st-century American memoirists
Members of Congress who became lobbyists